Beckman Catholic High School is a private, Roman Catholic high school in Dyersville, Iowa.  It is located in the Roman Catholic Archdiocese of Dubuque.

Background

Beckman Catholic High School was founded in 1966 as a consolidated Catholic high school serving several Catholic parishes in and around Dubuque and Delaware County.  The school is named after Archbishop Francis J. L. Beckman, sixth bishop of the Dubuque Archdiocese (1930–1946).  In recent years, Beckman has been nationally ranked as a top 20 academic U.S. Catholic high school, a top 50 U.S. Catholic high school, and a top 50 Iowa AP high school.

Feeder schools

Previously Beckman Catholic had a relationship with Archbishop Hennessy Catholic School, the joint parish school of Saints Peter and Paul Church in Petersburg and Saint Boniface Church in New Vienna.

Athletics
Beckman Catholic High School is a member of the Iowa High School Athletic Association.  They have won the following IHSAA State Championships:

 Boys Baseball - 1968, 1986, 2000, 2012, 2013, 2017
 Boys Soccer - 2015, 2016
 Boys Track and Field - 1997, 1999
 Girls Golf - 1992, 2012, 2015
 Co-ed Speech - 2007

Notable alumni

 Dave Haight, Former All-American and Big Ten Defensive Lineman of the Year for the Iowa Hawkeyes
 Mike Haight, Former NFL player (New York Jets, Washington Redskins)
 Matt Tobin, Former NFL player (Philadelphia Eagles, Seattle Seahawks)

See also
List of high schools in Iowa

External links

 Beckman Catholic School

Notes and references

Dyersville, Iowa
Schools in Delaware County, Iowa
Schools in Dubuque County, Iowa
Educational institutions established in 1966
Private high schools in Iowa
Private middle schools in Iowa
Roman Catholic Archdiocese of Dubuque
Catholic secondary schools in Iowa
1966 establishments in Iowa